Miss Pinkerton is a 1932 American pre-Code comedy mystery film about a nurse who becomes involved in a murder investigation. It stars Joan Blondell, George Brent and Ruth Hall.

Plot

Cast
 Joan Blondell as Nurse Adams aka "Miss Pinkerton"
 George Brent as Police Inspector Patten
 Ruth Hall as Paula Brent
 John Wray as Hugo
 Elizabeth Patterson as Juliet Mitchell
 C. Henry Gordon as Dr. Stuart
 Holmes Herbert as Arthur Glenn
 Mary Doran as Florence Lenz
 Blanche Friderici as Mary
 Allan Lane as Herbert Wynn (scenes deleted)
 Nigel De Brulier as Coroner James A. Clemp (as Nigel de Brulier)
 Eulalie Jensen as Miss Gibbons
 Walter Brennan as Police Dispatcher (uncredited)
 Lyle Talbot as Newspaper Editor (uncredited)

See also
The Nurse's Secret (1941)

References

External links

1932 films
1930s comedy mystery films
American comedy mystery films
American black-and-white films
Films based on American novels
Films directed by Lloyd Bacon
Films based on works by Mary Roberts Rinehart
1932 comedy films
1930s English-language films
1930s American films
Films scored by Bernhard Kaun